The Foxfield Races are a set of steeplechase races that originated in 1978 and are held twice annually in Albemarle County, Virginia, approximately eight miles northwest of downtown Charlottesville.  It is a popular tradition for much of the community as well as students of the University of Virginia and other universities on the East Coast.  Foxfield holds two races each year, one in the fall and another in the spring. The fall race has a more family-friendly atmosphere, while the spring race tends to attract a larger proportion of local college students. Each race generally benefits a local organization or charity; previous groups include Service Dogs of Virginia, the Ronald McDonald House, and Kids Pan Alley. There are many different color passes that can be purchased allowing access to certain areas in and around the track itself. Tickets can be purchased from the official website or from numerous outlets around the Charlottesville area, as well as surrounding areas.  Traditionally, students and other attendees dress in a Southern, aristocratic style often seen at other steeplechase and horse racing events across the South.  Seersucker, bowties, and pastel colors predominate the atmosphere, particularly at the spring race.

History
The Foxfield Races are premier steeplechase horse racing events held annually in Albemarle, Virginia. The races take place twice a year: the last Saturday in April, and the last Sunday in September.  The races were created by Mariann de Tejeda on property that was once owned by the well-known Virginian horseman, huntsman, and teacher, Grover Vandevender.  The property was originally a private horse farm. When De Tejeda bought the property after Vandevender's death in 1973, she began the construction of a steeplechase course dedicated to his memory. The final product fulfilled the dreams envisioned by de Tejeda and the late Vandevender. The first Foxfield race was held in the spring of 1978, and has since become a popular tradition among Charlottesville residents, students of the University of Virginia, as well as alumni from the university.
Foxfield is a tailgating event, and thus, unlike many steeplechase racing events, there are no grandstands.  There are many different ticket options for the race, hence some purchase general admission tickets and observe the race along the hillsides of the course.  Furthermore, there are many sponsors of the race, and businesses are able to rent out private tents.  Attendees of the race are known to wear fairly formal clothing, and even tailgates with elaborate spreads of elegant china and linens reflect upon this image.

Spring races: a UVA tradition
The Foxfield Races are a longstanding University of Virginia tradition. Some chide the event as the pinnacle representation of the upper middle class nature of UVA's student demographic. Students use Race Day as an excuse to break out their “preppiest” attire. There is an abundance of pastel colors, Lilly Pulitzer patterns, and large sun hats. Girls are found wearing sundresses, and many boys don a colorful bowtie for the occasion. Students tailgate at plots which are often organized through Greek organizations or other student groups.

Each spring the Foxfield Races hold a “black tie” event the evening before the big race. The event supports local charities. The 2009 beneficiary, for example, was the Ronald McDonald House of Charlottesville. The event took the form of a “Sumo Gala." Complete with 12-world class Sumo wrestlers from the United States Sumo Confederation, the tournament was modeled after a Las Vegas-style boxing match. Instead of the usual dinner and dance, the evening was filled with a sushi feast and auction.

Fall races: family weekend
Each fall the Foxfield Races holds a fall race and family weekend. The fall races sees an attendance of around 3,000 to 4,000 people year, a number small in comparison to the 25,000 that attend the spring race each year. Family weekend is a more relaxed atmosphere than that of the spring race. The activities are directed toward family participation. It is held each year on the last Sunday of September and benefits a local organization. Past beneficiaries include the Service Dogs of Virginia Foundation and the Shelter for Help and Emergency. This race targets the Charlottesville area as well as its surrounding communities.

Race day

Watching the races

Watching a steeplechase race is a rather simple undertaking, as it is the horse that comes over the finish line first that wins. However, before this occurs, several steps must be undergone.  First, the horse's trainer must officially declare that the horse is on grounds for a specified period before the beginning of its race.  Furthermore, the rider must report to the clerk of scales and weigh out with the minimum prescribed weight. If the jockey and his gear do not meet the minimum weight requirement, lead is inserted into the saddle pad.
At the specified time, the horse, trainer, and jockey must report to the paddock area or saddling enclosure.  It is there that the horse is tacked up with a racing bridle and saddle, the proper girth straps, and a number cloth.  The paddock judge then checks the horse as well as the jockey's silks.  After approval, the horses are then paraded to the post and come under starter's orders.  The starter of the race always tries to arrange a start that is fair for all of the horses and jockeys.  At the drop of the tape or flags, the race begins.
During the race, the horses must stay on the prescribed track, and, if obstacles are involved, they must jump over each one in the proper order.  There must not be interference by horses and jockeys with the other horses and jockeys.  At the end of the race, the placing judges note the horses and jockeys order of finish.  At this point, the riders and their horses return to the judges’ area and wait for permission to be dismounted, though at this time no one is allowed to touch the rider or tack until he has weighed in.  And finally, with no objections, and if the patrol judges report that all went smoothly and the jockeys weigh in with their original start of the race weight, the unofficial race results are declared official.
At the Foxfield Races, there are no grandstands; therefore viewers are encouraged to walk up to the straight-away or fences where they are able to see the race up close.

Viewing areas and accommodations
Given the lack of grandstands at the race, spectators are divided into multiple viewing areas. Access to these areas is generally determined by the type (or color) of ticket the spectator purchases. The different colors correspond to the location of the viewing area.
 Orange section: the Orange section is one of two areas in the infield of the racetrack, and is generally reserved for students. This section also includes the race tower, paddock, and president's tent. 
 Green section: the Green section is the second of the two areas in the infield of the racetrack, and generally holds students, alumni, and the general public.
 Blue section: the Blue section is located on the outside rail, and is open to the general public.
  Purple and Pink sections: the Pink and Purple sections are also located on the outside rail, and hold event sponsors and patrons.
 Yellow section: the Yellow section is also on the outside rail, and is available to seniors and the handicapped.

The Foxfield Racing Association also set up two more exclusive viewing areas to appeal to sponsors of the event.
Chalet Tents: These are tents located on the infield of the races, separated from the Orange and Green sections. Chalet tents offer a larger amount of space than a normal plot on the infield and also provide a more social environment that contrasts the private environment of the South Hill Tent area.  The Tents are about 400 sq. ft. and are welcomed to large parties and entertainment.
South Hill: This is a tent area located on the outfield of the race that is removed from other viewing sections in a more private location.   The tent area also includes its own parking so that those going to the South Hill Tent area do not have to be a part of the Foxfield traffic around the East and West Gate entrances.  In the past groups such as the Charlottesville Young Professionals, Wintergreen Performing Arts Center etc. have all rented out South Hill Tents in order to bring groups of people together to meet and get to know one another.

Sponsorships
Every year the Foxfield Racing Association (FRA) allows a large number of corporations to come sponsor the Foxfield Races.  This allows a company to promote their products to the large number of people that attend the Foxfield Races each year.  Also this as a way to provide entertainment for fellow employees, families, and prospects.  By becoming a sponsor, the company is offered a variety of specialty packages.

Environmental initiatives

Go Green
As a part of 2009 Foxfield Races, the Foxfield Racing Association (FRA) has initiated a “Go Green” Program which encourages people attending the races to not use glass and to start recycling their cans.  As a part of the “Go Green” program the FRA will now transport all trash from the races to a recycling center and not a landfill.  Also another part of the program is that the FRA has provided large containers (supplied by the company Container Rentals) for attendees to put filled trash bags.  This program is a reply to the complaints of many civilians and people of the amount of trash that is left behind or found after the Spring Foxfield race, and as a response to the cooler size change which will lead to a large increase in Styrofoam coolers.

Liability and safety

Alcohol policies
Out of the approximately 23,000 patrons attending the event, about 8,000 are college students who attend the University of Virginia and other schools. Patrons 21 and older are allowed to drink alcohol at Foxfield on race day. In the past, this demographic has worn “over 21” armbands, but since 2009 ID checking has become the norm. Patrons must carry their IDs all day as ABC agents and police will be checking the IDs of spectators.

In 2008 Albemarle County Commonwealth Attorney Denise Lunsford was quoted saying “What in the past has been sometimes loosely referred to as 'the Foxfields discount’ will not be the case anymore”. From this point onward crimes committed at the races would no longer be seen as a minor offense, but would be treated with the same weight as a regular crime.  Also the regulations of 2008 brought about the ban of alcohol-related items such as ice luges, and beer bongs.

A student-formed group at the University of Virginia called “Alcohol and Drug Abuse Prevention Team” (ADAPT) partners with a number of groups to promote protective drinking behavior and safe transportation options at the Foxfield Races. The group has coordinated student education programs at UVA to inform students how to minimize the risks of drinking and provide alternatives for getting home. In the past, the program has been held as a panel discussion made up of ADAPT members, the Foxfield Racing Association, local police and Alcoholic Beverage Control agents, the local commonwealth's attorney, the Rescue Squad, and the UVA dean of students. The Foxfield Racing Association funds a non-drinking driver program called “The Savvy Fox”. This program is administered by ADAPT. If a patron signs the Savvy Fox Pledge at the race meet, thy agree to be a designated driver and not drink all day, and receive a coupon for lunch and free non-alcoholic drinks. The sign up tables and distribution area are a part of the ADAPT safety tent. In 2008, 466 individuals signed the Savvy Fox Pledge.

Medical safety
There are three first aid stations at Foxfield on the day of the races. These stations are staffed by the UVA Emergency Department and are identified by a large white flag with a green first aid cross. The three station locations are: in between the airplane hangar and the West Gate, in the Orange student section, and in the Green section just after the crossing gate.

Past winners
These are the winners of the past ten years of the Spring and Fall Foxfield horse races.  Each race is made up of about six or seven races depending on the year, and the weather of that year.  The purses vary with each race.  Some of the races have no purse because the race was labeled as a “training flat” meaning that it was just a race on the turf of the track, no hurdles or fences.

References

External links
Foxfield Races 2008 Photos
Foxfield Races at the Official Charlottesville Convention & Visitors Bureau

Steeplechase (horse racing)